Helena Zmatlíková (19 November 1923, Prague – 4 April 2005, Prague) was a Czech illustrator, especially of children's books. For her works she received numerous awards. She also participated in the 1958 World Exhibition.

Career
Zmatlikova's paintings, which appeared in books published all over the world in more than 20 languages, have been popular with children for decades. The best known of these include:
 František Hrubín's Paleček
 Bohumil Říha´s Honzíkova cesta a O letadélku Káněti
 Czech edition of Astrid Lindgren´s The Six Bullerby Children (published by Albatros)
 those written by Eduard Petiška.

Personal life
Her nephew is Pavel Rychetsky, a lawyer and politician. Her son Ivan Zmatlík was married to the actress , with whom he has a daughter, Helena.

She was buried at the Vyšehrad Cemetery in Prague.

Tribute
On November 19, 2013, Google celebrated her 90th birthday with a Google Doodle.

References

External links
 Biography (in Czech)
 Short bio (in English)

Czech illustrators
Artists from Prague
1923 births
2005 deaths
Czech women artists
Czech women illustrators
Czech children's book illustrators
20th-century Czech painters
Burials at Vyšehrad Cemetery